Anier Octavio García Ortiz (born March 9, 1976) is a Cuban track and field athlete, winner of the 110 metres hurdles at the 2000 Summer Olympics.

Born in Santiago de Cuba, Anier García established his credentials early, by winning the 1995 Pan American Junior Championships. In the next year, at the 1996 Summer Olympics, García was eliminated in the quarter-finals.

In 1997, García broke to the international scene by winning 60 m hurdles at the 1997 World Indoor Championships at Paris. At the World Championships in Athens, he competed with a leg injury, and although he finished second in his quarter-final, he withdrew from the semi-finals. In 1999, García won the Pan-American Games, but was beaten second by Colin Jackson at the World Championships.

The high peak of García's career was at the 2000 Sydney Olympics. The Olympic final was expected to be a tight competition amongst the top five hurdlers, but García won the gold medal easily, beating Terrence Trammell by 0.16 seconds. García repeated his silver medal at the 2001 World Championships and also won silver at the 2001 World Indoor Championships and 2003 World Indoor Championships. García did not compete at the 2003 World Championships due to a thigh injury, but at the 2004 Summer Olympics, he won the bronze medal.

Personal bests

Achievements

References

Living people
1976 births
Sportspeople from Santiago de Cuba
Cuban male hurdlers
Athletes (track and field) at the 1996 Summer Olympics
Athletes (track and field) at the 2000 Summer Olympics
Athletes (track and field) at the 2004 Summer Olympics
Athletes (track and field) at the 1999 Pan American Games
Olympic athletes of Cuba
Olympic gold medalists for Cuba
Olympic bronze medalists for Cuba
World Athletics Championships medalists
Medalists at the 2000 Summer Olympics
Medalists at the 2004 Summer Olympics
Olympic gold medalists in athletics (track and field)
Olympic bronze medalists in athletics (track and field)
Pan American Games medalists in athletics (track and field)
Pan American Games gold medalists for Cuba
Universiade medalists in athletics (track and field)
Goodwill Games medalists in athletics
Central American and Caribbean Games gold medalists for Cuba
Competitors at the 1998 Central American and Caribbean Games
Universiade silver medalists for Cuba
World Athletics Indoor Championships winners
Central American and Caribbean Games medalists in athletics
Medalists at the 1997 Summer Universiade
Competitors at the 1998 Goodwill Games
Competitors at the 2001 Goodwill Games
Medalists at the 1999 Pan American Games